Aloina aloides is a species of moss belonging to the family Pottiaceae. It has a cosmopolitan distribution.

References

Pottiaceae